Pepperstone is a Melbourne-based broker specializing in providing markets access to financial instruments, including Forex, index, share, commodities, and cryptocurrencies CFDs.

History
Pepperstone was founded in 2010 by Owen Kerr and Joe Davenport. 

Joe Davenport and Owen Kerr both received the Australian EY Entrepreneurs Of The Year award in 2014.

In 2013, Pepperstone helped the Australian Securities and Investments Commission and Australian Federal Police uncover Australia's largest insider trading case in history. Another media report claimed that a senior employee was sacked after tipping off the regulator.

In 2014, the firm was ranked #1 on BRW Fast Starters, with reported revenues of $60m and 66% growth.

In October 2014, Pepperstone ceased accepting Japanese clients after an inquiry by ASIC regarding the lack of a license from the Japanese Financial Services Agency.

In March 2016 Pepperstone announced it had finalized the sale of most of its business to Champ Private Equity.

In February 2017, to comply with its FCA obligations, the firm temporarily closed down their UK operations.

CHAMP Private Equity sold its stake in Pepperstone 2.5 years after investing in the online investment platform. The business was bought by its senior management team led by chief executive Tamas Szabo and CHAMP managing director Fiona Lock.

The Association of Tennis Professionals (ATP) agreed a global partnership with Pepperstone in May 2022, a deal that includes the naming rights to the official ATP rankings.

Services and operation 
Pepperstone maintains an interbank network utilizing Equinix. Pepperstone utilizes various third-party currency trading tools and infrastructure, including Ctrader, MetaTrader 4 and 5, TradingView and Capitalise.ai.

Pepperstone offers a standard account type, oriented towards smaller accounts, and a Razor account with tighter spreads for more advanced and Expert Advisor (EA) algorithmic traders.

Regulation and protection 
Services are offered from multiple legal entities. Pepperstone Limited serves clients globally. The company is regulated by the FCA UK, ASIC Australia, CySEC Cyprus, DFSA Dubai, CMA Kenya, SCB Bahamas and BaFin Germany.

References

Financial services companies established in 2010
Companies based in Melbourne
Financial services companies of Australia
Financial derivative trading companies
Australian companies established in 2010